Bezhan Dadiani (died 1728), of the House of Dadiani, was Prince of Mingrelia from 1715 to 1728. He acceded to power in a coup against his own father, Giorgi IV Dadiani, and came to dominate western Georgian politics by asserting tutelage over King Alexander V of Imereti until being murdered by Ottoman agents.

Early life 
Bezhan was the second of Giorgi IV Dadiani by his wife, Sevdia Mikeladze, whom Giorgi divorced, in 1701, to marry Tamar, daughter of the powerful prince Giorgi-Malakia Abashidze, sometime King of Imereti. In 1704, Giorgi made his eldest son, Katsia, prince of Mingrelia and installed Bezhan as lord of Lechkhumi, of which he had dispossessed his younger brother, Iese. Giorgi himself retired to the patrimonial fiefdom of Salipartiano, but continued to wield significant influence on his sons until 1709, when Katsia and Bezhan—who never forgave Giorgi for divorcing their mother—forced Giorgi into flight to Abkhazia. Giorgi returned as prince of Mingrelia after Katsia's death in 1710, but his renewed authority was challenged by Bezhan, who enjoyed support of King George VII of Imereti.

Rise to power 
In 1715, Bezhan invited Giorgi for family reconciliation, but had him disarmed and deposed. Giorgi was confined by Bezhan to house arrest and persuaded to remarry Sevdia Mikeladze, with whom Giorgi lived until his death later that year. Like his father, Bezhan became involved in incessant intrigues and power struggles in Imereti. In 1720, he made accord with the Ottoman government and helped crown Alexander V, son of the murdered king George VII. Bezhan married his daughter Mariam to the young king Alexander and became the kingdom's most influential nobleman. He also intervened in Guria on several occasions, but eventually made peace with Giorgi IV Gurieli. While Bezhan dominated western Georgia, an Ottoman force was stationed in the Imeretian capital of Kutaisi, and Alexander was relegated to managing just his crown estates.

Regent in Imereti 
The two men were in uneasy alliance; Dadiani even contemplated to kill Alexander, but refrained from betraying the king, his son-in-law, because of his daughter and because Alexander had devoted bodyguards. Bezhan was ruthless in crushing opposition; rival noblemen were killed or arrested. He had his brother Manuchar cast in prison and another, Bishop Gabriel of Chqondidi, defrocked once this corrupted and slave-trading cleric became involved in intrigues against Bezhan and Alexander. The two rulers then campaigned against the defiant duke of Racha, who finally agreed to peace and married Dadiani's daughter in 1726.

Dadiani's power and prestige alarmed another influential Imeretian nobleman, Zurab Abashidze, who persuaded the Ottoman pasha of Akhaltsikhe, Isaq, to send his son Yusuf for meeting with Bezhan Dadiani at the Geguti castle near Kutaisi in 1728. Bezhan was assured of safety and was stabbed to death the moment he entered the castle.

Family 
Bezhan married, in 1715, Princess Tamar Gelovani. He had six sons and three daughters:

 Otia Dadiani (died 1757), Bezhan's successor as Prince of Mingrelia;
 Prince Beri Dadiani;
 Prince Katsia (Katso-Giorgi) Dadiani (died 1735), whose daughter, Darejan, was married to the penultimate king of Georgia, Heraclius II;
 Prince Manuchari Dadiani;
 Gabriel Dadiani, Bishop of Chqondidi;
 Grigol Dadiani (died 1777), metropolitan bishop;
 Princess Mariam (died 1731), wife of King Alexander V of Imereti;
 Princess Darejan Dadiani, wife of Mamuka of Imereti;
 Princess Khvaramze Dadiani, who married, successively, Prince Giorgi Nakashidze, Prince Giorgi IV Gurieli, and Shoshita III, Duke of Racha.

References 

1728 deaths
House of Dadiani
18th-century people from Georgia (country)
18th-century murdered monarchs
Regents of Georgia
1728 murders in Europe
1728 murders in Asia